Ondřej Kúdela (born 26 March 1987) is a Czech professional footballer who plays as a centre-back for Liga 1 club Persija Jakarta and the Czech Republic national team. He previously played for Slovácko, Sparta Prague, Mlada Boleslav and Slovan Liberec and Slavia Prague. Kúdela also had loan spells at Kladno and Kazakh club FC Ordabasy.

Style of play
Kúdela is normally played as a centre-back, though he has also been used as a defensive midfielder. At the end of the 2021 season he was voted as the best defender in the Czech league.

Club career
Kúdela came up through the youth system at Slovácko and made his debut appearance for the first team in 2005.

In 2007 he moved to Sparta Prague, spending a half-year loan spell at Kladno that same year.

In 2009 he was signed by Mladá Boleslav as a replacement for the outgoing Jan Rajnoch. He remained at the club for eight seasons, except for a half-year loan spell at Kazakh side Ordabasy in 2014. He was part of the Mladá Boleslav side that won the 2010–11 Czech Cup, being substituted off in the 8th minute of the final, and also the side that won the 2015–16 Czech Cup.

In January 2017 Kúdela signed a contract with Slovan Liberec for two and a half years.

In 2018 he transferred to Slavia Prague, shortly after head coach Jindřich Trpišovský. With Slavia he won a total of three league titles, three cups and one supercup.

In June 2022 he joined Indonesian Liga 1 side Persija Jakarta. On 23 July 2022, He made his league debut by starting in a 0–1 loss against Bali United.

Controversy
On 18 March 2021, Kúdela was accused of racially abusing Rangers midfielder Glen Kamara during a Europa League Round of 16 match. Kúdela denied the accusation and claimed he was assaulted by Kamara in the tunnel after the match, and Slavia Prague lodged a criminal complaint while criticising Rangers' handling of the situation. On 14 April, he was officially found guilty of racial abuse by UEFA and was banned for ten UEFA matches, ruling him out of playing any game in the upcoming Euro 2020 championship; Kamara meanwhile was handed a three-match ban for assaulting Kúdela in the tunnel after the game.

Kúdela appealed against his ban, but the appeal was rejected by UEFA on 26 May 2021. He then began the process of appealing the ban to the Court of Arbitration for Sport, and a hearing was scheduled for April 2022. However, a month before the hearing was due to take place, Kúdela dropped his appeal and formally apologised to Kamara. Kamara's lawyer said that his client was happy that the matter had now been closed.

Career statistics

Club

International

Honours
 SK Slavia Prague
Czech First League: 2018–19, 2019–20, 2020–21
Czech Cup:  2017–18, 2018–19, 2020–21
Czech Rupublic U-20
FIFA U-20 World Cup runner-up: 2007
Individual
Czech First League Defender of the Year: 2020–21

References

External links
 

Living people
1987 births
People from Uherské Hradiště District
Czech footballers
Association football central defenders
Czech Republic international footballers
Czech Republic youth international footballers
Czech Republic under-21 international footballers
Czech First League players
Kazakhstan Premier League players
Liga 1 (Indonesia) players
1. FC Slovácko players
AC Sparta Prague players
SK Kladno players
FK Mladá Boleslav players
FC Ordabasy players
FC Slovan Liberec players
SK Slavia Prague players
Czech expatriate footballers
Czech expatriate sportspeople in Kazakhstan
Expatriate footballers in Kazakhstan
Sportspeople from the Zlín Region
Persija Jakarta players
Expatriate footballers in Indonesia
Czech expatriate sportspeople in Indonesia